Hydestile is a medium-sized hamlet between the villages of Busbridge and Hambledon, straddling their civil parish borders, centred  south of Godalming in Waverley, south west Surrey.   The other main landmark is Hydon's Ball, a large woodland and promontory of the Greensand Ridge, about which a very old poem has been written; the site is within National Trust land and free to visitors.

History

Hydestile was the site for two hospitals built on land that formed part of the Busbridge Hall Estate: from 1921 King George V Hospital  (formerly a TB Sanatorium) and from 1941 St. Thomas' Hospital (formed from the World War II evacuation of St. Thomas' Hospital in Lambeth).  The hospitals were demolished and redeveloped in the late 1990s following years of disuse and dereliction. The only visible remains are the Gatehouse, former Superintendent's house, 6 staff cottages and a cluster of footings amongst the woods.

Geography
The hamlet is centred on the crossroads of Hambledon Road and Salt Lane.  To the south-east is the steeper of two neighbouring outcrops of the Greensand Ridge.  Elevations range from, 74m in the narrow wooded vale of the Shad Well spring that issues near the central crossroads of the hamlet and flows to the north, to 117m AOD less than a mile to the east.  

To the west hamlets Enton Green and Great Enton share one 2011 census output area (of between 50 and 150 homes) and their surrounding terrain is flatter, they are mentioned in the article on their civil parish, Hambledon.

Landmarks
Hydon's Ball (a steep, wooded hill) (NT)
A Cheshire Home. 
The Tolt, Hydon Heath and Busbridge Woods are three woodlands that are on the peripheral of the cluster of homes in the hamlet's centre.

Demography
The settlement has a small population, split between two considerably larger United Kingdom Census 2011 output areas: E00157389 (north-east and beyond) and E00157740 (rest and beyond).

External links
 www.HambledonSurrey.co.uk
 TeeBeeLand - History of King George V Hospital Hydestile

References

Hamlets in Surrey